Stephen R. Archambault (born August 11, 1965) is an American politician currently serving as a member of the Rhode Island Senate from District 22. Archambault was a Democratic candidate for Attorney General of Rhode Island in 2010.

Education
Archambault earned his BA from American University in 1990, his MS in Justice from Salve Regina University in 1996, and his JD from Roger Williams University School of Law in 2000.

Elections
2012 When District 22 Democratic Senator John Tassoni retired and left the seat open, Archambault was unopposed for the September 11, 2012 Democratic Primary, winning with 1,626 votes, and won the November 6, 2012 General election with 7,389 votes (59.0%) against Republican nominee Richard Poirier.
2010 When Rhode Island Attorney General Patrick C. Lynch was term limited and the position was open, Archambault ran in the three-way September 23, 2010 Democratic Primary, but lost to state Representative Peter Kilmartin, who won the five-way November 2, 2010 General election against Republican nominee Erik Wallin, Moderate candidate Christopher Little, and Independents Keven McKenna and Robert Rainville.

References

External links
Official page at the Rhode Island General Assembly
Campaign site

Steve Archambault at Ballotpedia
Stephen R. Archambault at the National Institute on Money in State Politics

1953 births
Living people
American University alumni
People from Smithfield, Rhode Island
Rhode Island lawyers
Democratic Party Rhode Island state senators
Roger Williams University alumni
Salve Regina University alumni
21st-century American politicians
Roger Williams University School of Law alumni